Lucio Tiozzo (Chioggia, 12 October 1956) is an Italian politician from Veneto.

A long-time member of the left-wing of the Italian Socialist Party (for which he was Mayor of Chioggia from 1988 to 1991), in the 1990s Tiozzo joined the post-communist Democrats of the Left and, in 2007, the Democratic Party. He was elected to the Regional Council of Veneto in 2000, 2005 and 2010.

References

People from Chioggia
Mayors of places in Veneto
Italian Socialist Party politicians
Democrats of the Left politicians
Democratic Party (Italy) politicians
21st-century Italian politicians
1956 births
Living people
Members of the Regional Council of Veneto